Zawila may refer to:

Zawila, Libya
Zawīla, a suburb of Mahdia, Tunisia
Zeila, a port in Somalia